Graphea is a genus of moths in the family Erebidae. The genus was described by Schaus in 1894.

Species
Graphea marmorea
Graphea paramarmorea
Graphea pseudomarmorea

References

Phaegopterina
Moth genera